Bulbophyllum dependens is a species of orchid in the genus Bulbophyllum.
Found in New Guinea in forests on trees at elevations around 1200 meters.

References
The Bulbophyllum-Checklist
The Internet Orchid Species Photo Encyclopedia

dependens